Bertol may refer to:
 Bertol (surname)
 Dents de Bertol, a multi-summited mountain in the Swiss Pennine Alps
 Pointe de Bertol, a mountain in the Swiss Pennine Alps
 Bertol Hut, a mountain hut overlooking the Bertol Pass in Valais, Switzerland
 Antonio Bertoloni or Bertol., botanist

See also
 Bertoloni
 Giuseppe Bertoloni or G.Bertol., botanist